Ocean-to-Ocean Highway may refer to:
National Old Trails Road
Pikes Peak Ocean to Ocean Highway